Marlborough Street or Marlboro Street can refer to the following streets:
Great Marlborough Street in London, United Kingdom, often called Marlborough Street
V8 Marlborough Street in Milton Keynes, Buckinghamshire, United Kingdom, formally Marlborough Street
Marlborough Street (Boston), a street in Boston, USA's Back Bay
Marlborough Street (Bristol), a street in the centre of Bristol, United Kingdom
Marlborough Street (Derry) in Derry, Northern Ireland, United Kingdom
Marlborough Street, Dublin in Dublin, Ireland
Marlborough Street (Roseau) in Roseau, Dominica

See also
List of streets and squares in Dublin